The Haval H2 is a subcompact B-Segment CUV produced by the Chinese manufacturer Great Wall Motor.

History 
The Haval H2 Red Label debuted on the 2014 Beijing Auto Show. Despite having a Red Haval badge, the crossover was launched before the Red and Blue label market strategy. The Haval H2 Blue Label was launched later on the 2016 Chengdu Auto Show making the H2 the first Haval to be sold in both red and blue labels. While being priced similarly and having the same powertrain and performance, Red Label cars usually feature more conservative styling and Blue Label cars feature more aggressive styling and is aimed at younger markets.

The Haval H2 is powered by a turbocharged, 1.5-litre four-cylinder petrol engine producing 110 kW and 210Nm and mated to a six-speed automatic transmission.

As of July 2021, ANCAP's website lists the Haval H2 as having received the maximum safety ranking, five stars.

Malaysia 
The Haval H2 was launched in Malaysia in May 2016 with three variants available: Standard, Comfort and Premium. The Standard could only be had with a six-speed manual gearbox while the Comfort and Premium variants could only be had with a six-speed automatic unit. Early models were fully imported from China with locally assembled models officially available as of September 2016. Only two locally assembled models were available: Comfort and Premium.

Iran 

The Haval H2 was presented in the 2017 Tehran Automotive Show in Iran by Bahman Group, the builder of the car in Iran.

Europe 

In June 2019, Great Wall start the export in Italy of the H2 Red Label with 1.6 Turbo 146 HP petrol or biofuel LPG homologated Euro 6D-Temp.

Australia 

The Haval H2 was released in Australia under Great Wall(Not imported by Ateco) in 2014 only in Front Wheel Drive and the 1.5 litre turbo engine derived from Mitsubishi. It was release alongside other Haval SUVs of various sizes such as the H6, H8 and H9. 
The H2 was one of the most popular models sold at the time thanks to its low price point, comfort and modern features. It was eventually discontinued in 2021 with the new Haval Jolion replacing it along with the H6 update.

References 

Compact sport utility vehicles
H2
Front-wheel-drive vehicles
All-wheel-drive vehicles
2010s cars
Cars of China